H is for Hawk is a 2014 memoir by British author Helen Macdonald. It won the Samuel Johnson Prize and Costa Book of the Year award, among other honours.

Content
H is for Hawk tells Macdonald's story of the year she spent training a northern goshawk in the wake of her father's death. Her father, Alisdair Macdonald, was a respected photojournalist who died suddenly of a heart attack in 2007. Having been a falconer for many years, she purchased a young goshawk to help her through the grieving process.

Reception

The book reached The Sunday Times best-seller list within two weeks of being published in July 2014.

In an interview with The Guardian, Macdonald said, "While the backbone of the book is a memoir about that year when I lost my father and trained a hawk, there are also other things tangled up in that story which are not memoir. There is the shadow biography of TH White, and a lot of nature-writing, too. I was trying to let these different genres speak to each other." White was the author of The Goshawk (1951), an account of his own attempt to train a goshawk.

Kevin Jackson, writing for Literary Review, drew further comparisons between Macdonald and White, in that she resembles him "in her gluttony for words both homely and exotic, their associations and histories." Macdonald's rich vocabulary is distinguished by her passion for precision, Jackson wrote: "Her eye is every bit as educated as her mind."

Judges of the Samuel Johnson Prize specifically highlighted that marriage of genres as one of the reasons for selecting H is for Hawk as the winner.

An extract of this book is part of the anthology of Edexcel English Language IGCSE in the new specification.

Television
In "H is for Hawk: A New Chapter", part of BBC's Natural World series in 2017, she trained a new goshawk chick.

Awards and honours
2014 Samuel Johnson Prize, winner
2014 Costa Book of the Year, winner. 
2014 Duff Cooper Prize, shortlist.
2015 Thwaites Wainwright Prize, longlist.
2015 Andrew Carnegie Medal for Excellence in Nonfiction, shortlist.
2016 Prix du Meilleur Livre Étranger, winner

See also
Falconry training and technique

References

2014 non-fiction books
Costa Book Award-winning works
British memoirs
Nature books
Jonathan Cape books